Whitesburg is a town in Carroll County, Georgia, United States. The population was 588 at the 2010 census.

The McIntosh Reserve here is the former plantation of Chief William McIntosh, a prominent leader of the Lower Towns of the Creek Confederacy. He was executed at his home in 1825 on order of the National Council of the Creek Nation for having negotiated and signed the Treaty of Indian Springs that year, which ceded most of the Creek territory in Georgia and Alabama to the United States. The Creek National Council negotiated a new treaty with the United States the next year to gain a more favorable settlement, but most of the Creek were removed to Indian Territory in the 1820s and 1830s.

In the 21st century federally recognized tribes of the Creek include the Muscogee (Creek) Nation, Alabama-Quassarte Tribal Town, Kialegee Tribal Town, and Thlopthlocco Tribal Town of Oklahoma, the Coushatta Tribe of Louisiana, and the Alabama-Coushatta Tribe of Texas.

Acorn Creek, a tributary of the Chattahoochee River, originates just west of Whitesburg. It takes its name from Acorn Town, a Creek Indian settlement and plantation which stood near its mouth.

Geography
Whitesburg is located at  (33.493434, -84.913492).

Whitesburg is located along the Chattahoochee River in southeastern Carroll County. U.S. Route 27 Alternate and Georgia State Route 5 are the main routes through the town. U.S. Route 27 Alternate runs from northwest to southeast through the town, leading northwest  to Carrollton, the county seat, and southeast  to Newnan. GA-5 leads northeast from the town  to Douglasville and west  to Roopville.

According to the United States Census Bureau, the town has a total area of 2.8 square miles (7.3 km), of which 2.8 square miles (7.2 km) is land and 0.04 square mile (0.1 km) (1.07%) is water.

History
This area was long occupied by indigenous peoples. In the historic period after European encounter, it was occupied by members of the Creek Confederacy, a loose grouping of related peoples, and was known as the area of the Lower Towns by the early nineteenth century. William McIntosh, a mixed-race leader of the Creek, established a modest house and plantation here. He was executed in 1825 on order of the Creek National Council for having negotiated and signed the 1825 Treaty of Indian Springs, which ceded all remaining lands in Georgia and Alabama to the United States. He had violated tribal law, the Code of 1818 that protected communal property.

After Creek removal, American settlers entered the area from the east. Many became subsistence farmers. Whitesburg was established by European-American settlers in 1873. The community was named after A.J. White, a railroad official. The Georgia General Assembly incorporated Whitesburg in 1874.

Demographics

As of the census of 2000, there were 596 people, 224 households, and 165 families residing in the town. The racial makeup of the town was 82.21% White, 16.78% African American, 0.17% Native American, 0.17% Asian, and 0.67% from two or more races. Hispanic or Latino of any race were 0.34% of the population.

There were 224 households, out of which 29.9% had children under the age of 18 living with them, 54.5% were married couples living together, 14.3% had a female householder with no husband present, and 25.9% were non-families. 21.9% of all households were made up of individuals, and 10.7% had someone living alone who was 65 years of age or older. The average household size was 2.66 and the average family size was 3.10.

In the town, the population was spread out, with 25.5% under the age of 18, 10.1% from 18 to 24, 26.8% from 25 to 44, 23.2% from 45 to 64, and 14.4% who were 65 years of age or older. The median age was 36 years. For every 100 females, there were 94.8 males. For every 100 females age 18 and over, there were 88.9 males.

The median income for a household in the town was $26,750, and the median income for a family was $29,167. Males had a median income of $30,417 versus $22,353 for females. The per capita income for the town was $14,189. About 14.6% of families and 18.7% of the population were below the poverty line, including 27.7% of those under age 18 and 19.5% of those age 65 or over.

References

Towns in Carroll County, Georgia
Towns in Georgia (U.S. state)
Populated places established in 1873
Georgia populated places on the Chattahoochee River